Rose M. Patten,  is a Canadian businessperson and philanthropist. She has served as the 34th Chancellor of the University of Toronto since July 1, 2018. In March of 2021, she was re-elected to a second three-year term as chancellor. Born in St. John's, Newfoundland and Labrador, she is a Special Advisor to the CEO of BMO Financial Group.

Awards
In 2012, she was awarded the Queen Elizabeth II Diamond Jubilee Medal. In 2017, she was made an Officer of the Order of Canada in recognition for having "served her community with dedication and inspiration".

References

Businesspeople from St. John's, Newfoundland and Labrador
Living people
Canadian women business executives
Chancellors of the University of Toronto
Officers of the Order of Canada
Year of birth missing (living people)